Bluffdale Township is one of thirteen townships in Greene County, Illinois, USA.  As of the 2010 census, its population was 556 and it contained 273 housing units.

Geography

Cities, towns, villages
 Eldred

Unincorporated towns
 Boyle at 
 Woody at 
(This list is based on USGS data and may include former settlements.)

Extinct towns
 Columbiana at 
 Hurricane at 
(These towns are listed as "historical" by the USGS.)

Cemeteries
The township contains these four cemeteries: Eldred, Eldred Memorial Gardens, Mulberry and Richwoods West.

Major highways
  Illinois Route 108

Airports and landing strips
 Herschberger Landing Strip
 The Adwell Corporation Airport

Rivers
 Illinois River

Demographics

School districts
 Carrollton Community Unit School District 1

Political districts
 Illinois' 17th congressional district
 State House District 97
 State Senate District 49

References
 
 United States Census Bureau 2007 TIGER/Line Shapefiles
 United States National Atlas

External links
 City-Data.com
 Illinois State Archives

Townships in Greene County, Illinois
Townships in Illinois